The 2008 St. Petersburg Bowl was the inaugural edition of the new  college football bowl game, and was played at Tropicana Field in St. Petersburg, Florida.  The game was played beginning at 4:30 PM US EST on Saturday, December 20, 2008, and was telecast on ESPN2, saw the South Florida Bulls (based in nearby Tampa) defeat their former conference rivals Memphis Tigers, 41–14. Sean McDonough, Chris Spielman and Rob Stone called the game. For sponsorship reasons, the game was officially known as the 2008 magicJack St. Petersburg Bowl.

Scoring summary

References

External links
Box score at ESPN

St. Petersburg Bowl
Gasparilla Bowl
Memphis Tigers football bowl games
South Florida Bulls football bowl games
December 2008 sports events in the United States
St. Petersburg Bowl
21st century in St. Petersburg, Florida